The Futsal Club Championship, also referred as Hero Futsal Club Championship for sponsorship ties, is the highest level futsal club competition in India, organised by the All India Football Federation (AIFF). The inaugural edition kicked off on 5th November 2021 in New Delhi with 16 teams. It acts as qualifier for the AFC Futsal Club Championship, the highest level club futsal competition in Asia.

History 
On 10 December 2019, the AIFF executive committee decided that futsal club competition will be part of their calendar from 2020 season onwards. AIFF  invited clubs playing Indian Super League, I-League and state level futsal champions to participate in the inaugural season. The inaugural championship was originally planned to be held in July – August, but due to COVID-19 pandemic, it was postponed until 2021.

Competition format

2021–22 
The inaugural edition featured a total of 16 teams, which have been divided into four groups, played in a round-robin format. The highest-placed team from each group makes it to the semi-final stage, played in a knockout format. The winners of the tournament become futsal champions of India.

2022–23 
The second season had a total of 14 teams, divided into two groups of seven, where they play in the round robin format, before proceeding to the knockout rounds. The champion of the tournament will represent India at the AFC Futsal Club Championship.

Summaries

Statistics and records

Finals appearances by club

Media coverage 
On 3rd November 2021, the All India Football Federation announced that Eurosport India will broadcast the inaugural edition of the Hero Futsal Club Championship.

See also 
Football in India
Sport in India
History of Indian football
Indian football league system
AFC Futsal Asian Cup
FIFA Futsal World Cup
Asian Premier Futsal Championship
Futsal Association of India
Minifootball
Five-a-side football
Indoor soccer

References

External links 
AIFF futsal

Futsal competitions in India
2020 establishments in India
Recurring sporting events established in 2020
Futsal leagues in Asia
Asia
India